Robert Joe Wickman (born February 6, 1969) is a former Major League Baseball relief pitcher. Wickman played for the New York Yankees (–), Milwaukee Brewers (1996–), Cleveland Indians (2000–), Atlanta Braves (2006–), and Arizona Diamondbacks (2007). He batted and threw right-handed.

Amateur career 
Wickman is from Abrams, Wisconsin. At Oconto Falls High School, Wickman played football, baseball, horseback riding, table tennis and basketball, being named an All-State pick in basketball. After high school, he attended University of Wisconsin–Whitewater, and was selected by the Chicago White Sox in the 1990 Major League Baseball draft (2nd round) and signed by area scout Mike Rizzo. In 1992, he was sent by Chicago to the New York Yankees in the same trade that brought Steve Sax to the White Sox.

Major league career

New York Yankees
Wickman's career with the Yankees began with a superb record of 20–5 in his first two seasons (1992–1993), including a 14–4 mark in 1993. In the strike-shortened 1994 season, Wickman appeared in an American League-high 53 games, all in relief, and posted a 3.09 ERA for the league-leading Yankees. Though he slumped to a 4.05 ERA in 1995, he rebounded to pitch three shutout innings in the Division Series against the Seattle Mariners. The Yankees lost that series in five games to Seattle.

Milwaukee Brewers
In 1996, the Yankees traded Wickman to the Brewers before they won the World Series. After the Yankees won the World Series, they gave Wickman a World Series ring for being part of the active roster during the 1996 season. 
Wickman made his first All-Star Game appearance in 2000 as a member of the Milwaukee Brewers. The day after Wickman was traded to the Cleveland Indians, the Brewers chose to hold a Bob Wickman Poster Night.

Cleveland Indians
He was involved in a seven-player trade between the Brewers and Cleveland Indians, which included sending Richie Sexson to Milwaukee.
On May 7, 2006, Wickman became the Indians' all-time franchise leader in saved games with 130, surpassing the record previously held by Doug Jones. His 139 saves with the Indians was a club record until Cody Allen passed it July 3, 2018, and his 45 saves on the season in 2005 is tied for second-best in team history.

Atlanta Braves
On July 20, 2006, Wickman was traded to the Atlanta Braves for Single-A Rome catcher Max Ramírez. Wickman then served as Atlanta's closer, recording his first save on July 24.

On September 20, 2006, Wickman signed a one-year $6.5 million contract extension to stay with the Atlanta Braves for the 2007 season.

On August 24, 2007, after giving up a walk-off two-run home run to the Reds' Adam Dunn in extra innings, Wickman complained to manager Bobby Cox about pitching in non-save situations. Consequently, he was released.

Arizona Diamondbacks
On September 7, 2007, Wickman signed a contract with the Arizona Diamondbacks, a move that signaled that he had backed off his disdain for non-save situations, given that the team had an established closer in José Valverde. Wickman pitched in 8 games for the Diamondbacks, going 0–1 with a 1.35 ERA. He became a free agent after the season, subsequently retiring.

Wickman ended his career with 511 games finished, ranking 34th all time among major league pitchers.

Pitching style 
Wickman was known to rely on his sinker to save games. During a childhood farming accident, Wickman lost part of his index finger on his right hand, to which he credited much of the sinking motion on his sinker.

See also 

 List of Major League Baseball annual saves leaders

References

External links 

Wickmans's Warriors  – Official Bob Wickman Baseball Club

1969 births
Living people
National League All-Stars
American League All-Stars
American League saves champions
Sportspeople with limb difference
Arizona Diamondbacks players
Atlanta Braves players
Cleveland Indians players
Milwaukee Brewers players
New York Yankees players
Major League Baseball pitchers
Baseball players from Wisconsin
Gulf Coast White Sox players
South Bend White Sox players
Sarasota White Sox players
Birmingham Barons players
Columbus Clippers players
Lake County Captains players
Akron Aeros players
Buffalo Bisons (minor league) players
Sportspeople from Green Bay, Wisconsin
Wisconsin–Whitewater Warhawks baseball players
People from Abrams, Wisconsin